Kokkorevo is a village in the Vsevolozhsky District of the Leningrad Oblast, Russia. It is situated on the western shore of Lake Ladoga, and played a role in establishing supply lines during the Siege of Leningrad. The Broken Ring monument (:ru:Разорванное кольцо), part of the larger Green Belt of Glory complex, is located in the village.

References

External links
Музей "Дорога жизни"

Rural localities in Leningrad Oblast